During the 1987–88 English football season, Portsmouth F.C. competed in the Football League First Division, following promotion from the Second Division the previous season.

Kit
Admiral became Portsmouth's kit manufacturers for the season. For the first time in their history Portsmouth's kits wore sponsorship, South Coast Fiat (a Fiat dealership chain in the local area) sponsoring the kit.

Squad
Squad at end of season

Left club during season

Reserves

Transfers

In
  Barry Horne -  Wrexham, £60,000, 17 July 1987
  Ian Baird -  Leeds United, £285,000, 12 August 1987
  John Kerr -  Harrow Borough
  Ian Stewart -  Newcastle United

Out
  Brett Angell - released (later joined Cheltenham Town)
  Mick Kennedy -  Bradford City
  Ian Baird -  Leeds United, £120,000, March 1988
  Kenny Swain -  West Bromwich Albion, loan
  John Kerr -  Peterborough United, loan

Results

First Division

 22 August 1987 Portsmouth 2-2 Southampton
 26 September 1987 Portsmouth 2-1 Wimbledon
 3 January 1988 Southampton 0-2 Portsmouth
 19 April 1988 Wimbledon 2-2 Portsmouth

FA Cup

League Cup

Full Members Cup

References

Portsmouth F.C. seasons
Portsmouth